Lanusei is a town and comune in Sardinia in the Province of Nuoro.

References

Cities and towns in Sardinia